Georg Merz (26 January 1793 – 12 January 1867) was a Bavarian optician and manufacturer of astronomical telescopes and other optical instruments.

Life
Merz was born on 26 January 1793 in Bichl, in Bad Tölz-Wolfratshausen, now in Bavaria, Germany. There he became the assistant of Joseph Fraunhofer. From 1826, when Fraunhofer died, Merz was in charge of the optical division of the business. On the death of von Utzschneider in 1839 Merz, in partnership with Joseph Mahler, bought the firm. After Mahler's death he ran the business in partnership with his sons Ludwig and Sigmund. When Ludwig died in 1858 the name was changed to G. & S. Merz.

Georg Merz died in Munich on 12 January 1867. In 1882 the firm passed to Jacob and Matthias Merz, Sigmund's cousins, and in 1884 the Benediktbeuern works was closed. The company moved to Munich, and closed in 1903.

Telescopes

The 1845 Merz und Mahler 11″ refractor at the Cincinnati Observatory
The 1847 15″ Harvard Great Refractor at Harvard College Observatory  
The 1839 Merz und Mahler 15″ refractor at Pulkovo Observatory
The 1838 Merz 6″ (160 mm) refractor at Leiden Observatory
The Yellow House Observatory in Dover, MA
12½″ Merz refractor telescope at the Royal Observatory, Greenwich
5″ (135 mm) G. & S. Merz equatorial refractor telescope at the Astronomical Observatory of Capodimonte, Naples, Italy
8.05″ (218 mm)  Merz refractor telescope at the Brera Astronomical Observatory, Italy
Georg Merz and Sons, vintage 7¼″ refracting telescope at the Sydney Observatory
Georg Merz and Sons, vintage refracting telescope at the Quito Astronomical Observatory
An equatorial mounted achromatic refractor from his firm was used in discovery of Neptune.

References

1793 births
1867 deaths
Engineers from Bavaria
Optical engineers
Telescope manufacturers
People from Bad Tölz-Wolfratshausen
German scientific instrument makers